Central Congregational Church may refer to:

 Central Congregational Church (Galesburg, Illinois)
 Central Congregational Church (Eastport, Maine)
 Central Congregational Church (Fall River, Massachusetts)
 Central Congregational Church (Newton, Massachusetts)
 Central Congregational Church (Providence, Rhode Island)
 Central Congregational Church (Dallas, Texas)